Zombi is an icon-driven action-adventure video game. It was Ubisoft's first publication, released in 1986. It was programmed by Yannick Cadin and S. L. Coemelck, with graphics by Patrick Daher and music by Philippe Marchiset.

Gameplay
A first-person action adventure, it borrows heavily from the George A. Romero film Dawn of the Dead: four protagonists exploring a zombie-filled shopping mall, gunshops, escalators, and the articulated trucks used to block the entrances. If a character's health is depleted, he turns into a zombie, which then roams the room they died in. Zombies can be killed either by numerous body shots, or a single shot to the head. Characters are named after the creators of the game.

Ports
The game was re-released in 1990, with ports developed for the ZX Spectrum (by Geoff Phillips, Colin Jones and Steve Chance), Commodore 64 (Jean Noel Moyne, Laurent Poujoulat, Jean Francois Auroux), Amiga (Alexander Yarmitsky), Atari ST and DOS (Yannick Cadin).

Reception
The ZX Spectrum version was awarded 87% by Sinclair User magazine and 77% by Your Sinclair, both reviewers were impressed with the immersive atmosphere.

CU Amiga awarded the Amiga version of the game 85%, whilst German magazine Amiga Joker scored it at 69%.

Zzap!64 awarded the Commodore 64 version of the game 72%. The reviewer said that the gameplay is outdated and is very similar to Catch 23, a 1987 ZX Spectrum game.

See also

ZombiU, a similarly titled 2012 game from Ubisoft

References

External links

1986 video games
Action-adventure games
Amiga games
Amstrad CPC games
Atari ST games
Commodore 64 games
DOS games
Video games about zombies
Ubisoft games
Video games scored by David Whittaker
Video games developed in France
ZX Spectrum games